In archaeology a chopping tool is a stone tool. Stone tools have been dated using scientific dating such as Carbon 14 dating and Potassium argon dating. Stone tools have been found to be almost 2 million years old. Chopping tools have been found to be about 2 million years old as well. The oldest object in the British Museum is a Chopping Tool. It was found in the Olduvai Gorge in Tanzania. Since Chopping tools are a sub category of stone tools we can see how these tools have developed over time.

Looking at how these tools are made is an important part in the history of the Chopping Tool. A large, hard stone was needed as well as a softer stone that would be made into the chopper. The soft stone was commonly basalt (volcanic rock). The large hard stone acted as a hammer as it was hit against the soft stone. The soft stone would begin to chip away. The maker of the chopping tool would use the hard stone to create the edges and point needed to make the chopping tool efficient. Double sided sharp edges and a point are a common form of the chopping tool. The look is Similar to a Native American Projectile point, except that a chopping tool was used for stationary objects.

The use of the chopping tool varied from place to place just like any other archaeological artifact. Depending on what the maker of the chopping tool made or ate depended on what the chopping tool was used for. Most commonly the chopping tool was used for food purposes. They could be used for cutting down tree branches to get to fruits or to cut large plants that could be used for food. Anything that requires a knife today could have been replaced with a chopping tool. They were also used to help assist the maker in cutting the meat of the animals. Just like butchers today, skinning and cleaning of all the meat that we eat is needed. The chopping tool helped assist hunters gather the meat, especially from large animals that were hard to carry back to the location they were staying at, and make it edible for them to consume. Another use for the chopping tool was to smash bones. Bone marrow is a good source of nutrients to help your body function. For hunters and gatherers this was important since the next source of food could have been days to weeks away. When they would hunt animals they would use the sharp edge to cut the meat off the bones and then the back edge was hard enough to smash and crush bones. Once the bones were crushed the marrow could be collected.

The flakes that were chipped off the soft rock did not go to waste. Many of the thick sharp pieces were used as small knives to do very light cutting tasks. The flakes were a very important part of everyday life just like the chopping tool. Both pieces were used in everyday life to help with survival.

The idea of the chopping tool spread from people to people throughout the land. In Asia stone tools did not develop as much as other places in the world. To make these tools like the chopping tool you have to have specific types of rock such as flint and jasper. In Asia these rocks were hard to find but the amount of the coarse-grained rocks and material was much easier to find. Even though the materials they used such as volcanic material and petrified wood wasn't as strong or as easy to shape they still were able to make tools that resembled the chopping tool and they were used in very similar ways. Many of the tools that were found in Asia, they were found in the Choukoutienian caves. The Choukoutienian industry is where many of the stone tools in Asia started. The caves are filled with many artifacts and the early chopping tool is one of the many artifacts found.

The resources used to make many variations of the chopping tool were present in much of the world. Even if the items that were used to make the chopping tool in various parts of the world were not as durable or as powerful or sharp they still were used for cutting items as well as day to day survival.

References 

Lithics
Archaeological artefact types